Petar Dachev (born 15 June 1979, Troyan) is a retired Bulgarian long jumper, best known for his gold medal at the 2000 European Indoor Championships.

His personal best was 8.30 metres, achieved in June 2000 in Nicosia. This ranks him fourth among Bulgarian long jumpers, behind Ivaylo Mladenov, Atanas Atanasov and Nikolay Atanasov.

Achievements

References

1979 births
Living people
Bulgarian male long jumpers
Athletes (track and field) at the 2000 Summer Olympics
Athletes (track and field) at the 2004 Summer Olympics
Olympic athletes of Bulgaria
European Athletics Championships medalists
People from Troyan
21st-century Bulgarian people
20th-century Bulgarian people